Albert Harrison "Harry" Stafford (June 18, 1912 – November 23, 2004) was an American football halfback in the National Football League for the New York Giants.  He was inducted to the College Football Hall of Fame in 1975 after a stellar college career at the University of Texas.

References

External links

1912 births
2004 deaths
People from Wharton, Texas
Players of American football from Texas
American football running backs
American football defensive backs
Texas Longhorns football players
New York Giants players
College Football Hall of Fame inductees